The Roman Catholic Diocese of Kasongo is a diocese located in the cities of Kasongo  in the Ecclesiastical province of Bukavu in the Democratic Republic of the Congo.

History
 January 10, 1952: Established as Apostolic Vicariate of Kasongo from the Apostolic Vicariate of Baudouinville and the Apostolic Vicariate of Kivu
 November 10, 1959: Promoted as Diocese of Kasongo

Bishops

Ordinaries, in reverse chronological order
 Bishops of Kasongo (Latin Rite), below
 Bishop Placide Lumbamba Ndjibu, M.Afr. (since 2014.03.11)
 Bishop Théophile Kaboy Ruboneka (1995.11.02 - 2009.04.21), appointed Coadjutor Bishop of Goma
 Bishop Christophe Munzihirwa Mwene Ngabo, S.J. (1990.04.30 – 1995.03.14), appointed Archbishop of Bukavu
 Bishop Timothée Pirigisha Mukombe (1966.09.29 – 1990.04.30)
 Bishop Noël Mala (1963.04.05 – 1964.07.31)
 Bishop Richard Cleire, M. Afr. (1959.11.10 – 1963.04.05); see below
 Vicar Apostolic of Kasongo (Latin Rite), below
 Bishop Richard Cleire, M. Afr. (1952.01.10 – 1959.11.10); see above

Coadjutor bishop
Christophe Munzihirwa Mwene Ngabo, S.J. (1986-1990)

See also
Roman Catholicism in the Democratic Republic of the Congo

Sources
 GCatholic.org
 Catholic Hierarchy

Roman Catholic dioceses in the Democratic Republic of the Congo
Christian organizations established in 1952
Roman Catholic dioceses and prelatures established in the 20th century
1952 establishments in the French colonial empire
Roman Catholic Ecclesiastical Province of Bukavu